Keith Leonard Kartz  (born May 5, 1963) is a former center and tackle  in the National Football League for the Denver Broncos. He started in Super Bowl XXIV. Kartz attended the University of California, Berkeley. He graduated from San Dieguito High School in Encinitas, California.

1963 births
Living people
People from the Las Vegas Valley
American football centers
American football offensive tackles
California Golden Bears football players
Denver Broncos players
Ed Block Courage Award recipients